Broken Flag is a 1979 Mexican drama film directed by Gabriel Retes. It was entered into the 11th Moscow International Film Festival.

Cast
 Cristina Baker
 Fernando Balzaretti as Luis Iriarte
 Elpidia Carrillo as Veronica
 Mario Casillas
 Mario Diaz Mercado as Periodista
 Manuel Fábregas as Eduardo Vallejo
 Aarón Hernán
 Gonzalo Lora
 Juan Ángel Martínez
 Enrique Ontiveros

References

External links
 

1979 films
1979 drama films
Mexican drama films
1970s Spanish-language films
1970s Mexican films